Age Eternal is the debut and sole album of American doom metal band Middian, released on March 20, 2007.

Track listing
All songs written by Mike Scheidt.
 "Dreamless Eye" – 9:35
 "The Blood of Icons" – 11:30
 "Age Eternal" – 14:04
 "The Celebrant" – 6:11
 "Sink to the Center" – 15:48

Personnel
Middian
Mike Scheidt – guitar, vocals
Will Lindsay – bass guitar, vocals
Scott Headrick – drums, percussion

Additional personnel
Ben Ward (from Orange Goblin) – indecipherable rant on "Sink to the Center".

Production
Arranged & Produced By Middian
Engineered By Jeff Olsen
Mixed By Middian & Josh Alderson
Mastered By John Golden

References

External links
Apeshit.org review

2007 debut albums
Middian albums
Metal Blade Records albums